Martyn Barker (born 14 September 1959, Merseyside, England) is an English drummer, percussionist, multi-instrumentalist, composer and producer, best known as the drummer for Shriekback. He has also been a member of King Swamp, and worked with Robert Plant, Marianne Faithfull, Sarah Jane Morris, Billy Bragg, Beth Gibbons, Rustin Man, Alain Bashung and Juldeh Camara and Justin Adams. He currently has co-written and co-produced two records with songwriter, vocalist and multi-instrumentalist Talitha Rise, as well as producing and drumming for acts worldwide.

The track "Sacred Waters", which was taken from Barker's collaborative album with Emily Burridge was used as incidental music on Critical Role for the first episode of season 3.

Discography 
 Water & Stone, 2020 (with Emily Burridge)

References

1959 births
Living people
British male drummers
English rock drummers
English multi-instrumentalists
English record producers
Musicians from Liverpool